is a Japanese professional footballer who plays as a left back for J1 League club Kashima Antlers.

Youth career
Mizoguchi made his first appearance for Kashima Antlers Youth aged 16 in the Japan Youth Club Cup, making four appearances en route to the semi-final of the competition before being knocked out by Sagan Tosu U-18. The youth team reached the semi-final of the same competition in 2021, with Mizoguchi playing six games throughout.

Club career
In July 2021 it was announced that Mizoguchi would be joining the first-team squad of Kashima Antlers for the 2022 season. He made his debut on 18 May 2022, coming on as an 83rd minute substitute for Koki Anzai in a 3–1 J.League Cup victory against Gamba Osaka. In June 2022, he made the starting XI for the first time in a 2–1 Emperor's Cup win against Niigata University HWSC.

Career statistics

Club

International career
In March 2022, Mizoguchi was called up to the Japan U-19 squad.

References

External links
Profile at Kashima Antlers

2004 births
Living people
Association football people from Ibaraki Prefecture
Japanese footballers
Association football defenders
Kashima Antlers players